Michael Klaude Ruhs (born 27 August 2002) is an Australian professional footballer, who currently plays for Western United FC.

Career

Macarthur FC
Ruhs began his professional career at Macarthur FC, signing on for their inaugural season as an A-League club.

Ruhs scored the winning goal for Macarthur against Central Coast Mariners in the elimination final of the 2020-21 A-League season.

Central Coast Mariners
After two seasons at Macarthur FC, Ruhs moved to the Central Coast Mariners for the 2022-23 A-League season. Ruhs made 15 appearances for the Mariners, before agreeing a mutual termination of his contract midway through the season.

Western United
A day after his departure from the Mariners, Ruhs joined Western United.

References

External links

2002 births
Living people
Australian soccer players
Association football midfielders
Sydney United 58 FC players
Macarthur FC players
Central Coast Mariners FC players
Western United FC players
National Premier Leagues players
A-League Men players